Zacarías Supisiche (1843–1897) was an Argentine military man, who participated in the Argentine Civil War and Paraguayan War. He began his military career fighting against troops of General Justo José de Urquiza, taking an active part during the battles of Cepeda and Pavón.

His military campaigns also include his participation in the Conquest of the Desert, and the Conquest of the Chaco. He was part of the troops loyal to the Government during Revolution of the Park, serving as head of the City Garrison participated in the Battle of Plaza Libertad against the radical revolutionaries.

References

External links 
Argentina, National Census, 1869 
Argentina, National Census, 1895

1843 births
1897 deaths
People from Buenos Aires
Argentine generals
Argentine people of Italian descent
Argentine people of Spanish descent
Argentine Army officers
Burials at La Recoleta Cemetery